Austin Kaunda Muwowo (born 26 September 1996) is a Zambian footballer who plays as a forward for Orlando Pirates F.C. and the Zambia national football team.

Career

International

International Goals
Scores and results list Zambia's goal tally first.

References

External links

1996 births
Living people
Nkana F.C. players
Orlando Pirates F.C. players
South African Premier Division players
Zambian footballers
Zambia international footballers
Zambian expatriate footballers
Zambian expatriate sportspeople in South Africa
Association football forwards
Forest Rangers F.C. players